Ken Johnson (born November 24, 1968, in Marshfield, Massachusetts) is an American sport shooter. He tied for 38th place in the men's 10 metre air rifle event at the 2000 Summer Olympics. He is the husband of Olympic gold medalist Nancy Johnson.

References

1968 births
Living people
ISSF rifle shooters
American male sport shooters
Olympic shooters of the United States
Shooters at the 2000 Summer Olympics
Pan American Games medalists in shooting
Pan American Games gold medalists for the United States
Pan American Games bronze medalists for the United States
Shooters at the 1995 Pan American Games
Medalists at the 1995 Pan American Games
20th-century American people
21st-century American people